North Lanarkshire is one of 32 council areas of Scotland. It borders the north-east of the City of Glasgow and contains many of Glasgow's suburbs and commuter towns and villages. It also borders East Dunbartonshire, Falkirk, Stirling, South Lanarkshire and West Lothian. The council area covers parts of the historic counties of Dunbartonshire, Lanarkshire and Stirlingshire. The council is based in Motherwell.

The area was formed in 1996 covering the districts of Cumbernauld and Kilsyth, Motherwell, and Monklands, plus the Chryston and Auchinloch area from Strathkelvin district, all of which had been in Strathclyde region between 1975 and 1996. As a new single-tier authority, North Lanarkshire became responsible for all functions previously performed by both the regional council and the district councils, which were abolished.

History
The largest part of North Lanarkshire, being the approximately two-thirds of the council area lying generally south of the Luggie Water, was in the historic county of Lanarkshire. Lanarkshire had existed as a shire from around the time of King David I, who ruled Scotland from 1124 to 1153. The county took its name from the original county town at Lanark, now in South Lanarkshire, which had been the site of the first Parliament of Scotland under Kenneth II in 978. The northern parts of what is now North Lanarkshire were in the counties of Dunbartonshire and Stirlingshire prior to 1975, with Cumbernauld and the area generally north of Luggie Water and south of the River Kelvin being in Dunbartonshire, and Kilsyth and the area north of the Kelvin being in Stirlingshire. Prior to the 1975 reforms there were five burghs in the area now covered by North Lanarkshire:
Airdrie
Coatbridge
Cumbernauld (burgh status given in 1968 following growth of the new town)
Kilsyth
Motherwell and Wishaw (formerly two separate burghs prior to merging in 1920)

The population of the area which would become North Lanarkshire grew quickly during the Industrial Revolution. In the 18th century the area's towns, including Motherwell, were active in textile production. The discovery of coal and iron ore deposits in the 19th century, as well as the building of the Glasgow to Edinburgh railway, transformed the region. The towns of Motherwell, Coatbridge and Wishaw became centres of the iron and steel industry.

These industries began to decline in the second half of the 20th century, while a growth occurred in the financial and technology sectors, as well as a growth in logistics services related to the heavy goods traffic in the area. The new town of Cumbernauld expanded rapidly after World War II, and is now the largest town in North Lanarkshire. The growth of the Greater Glasgow metropolitan area into the south-western part of North Lanarkshire has also led to a large number of residential areas for commuters.

The North Lanarkshire council area was established in 1996 as part of a reorganisation of local government in the United Kingdom. This was the latest in a series of reforms, notably including the creation of Lanarkshire County Council in 1890 under the Local Government (Scotland) Act 1889, and the abolition of the county councils and creation of Strathclyde Regional council and lower-tier district councils in 1975 under the Local Government (Scotland) Act 1973. The 1996 reform abolished Strathclyde, and established North Lanarkshire as a merger of the districts of Cumbernauld and Kilsyth, Monklands, Motherwell and the Chryston area from Strathkelvin district (the rest of which went to East Dunbartonshire).

For lieutenancy purposes, North Lanarkshire straddles the Lanarkshire and Dunbartonshire lieutenancies, with the area generally north of Luggie Water (including Cumbernauld and Kilsyth) coming under the Dunbartonshire lieutenancy and the remainder coming under the Lanarkshire lieutenancy.

Geography and demographics
North Lanarkshire lies in the Central Valley of Scotland, to the east of Glasgow. It lies on the Scotland's north–south watershed with the River Clyde flowing through the west of the county on its way to the Irish Sea, and the River Almond in the east emptying into the Firth of Forth near Edinburgh. The northern areas consist of forests as well as higher areas such as the Kilsyth Hills.

The highest population density of North Lanarkshire is in the urbanised south-west, which is part of the Greater Glasgow metropolitan area. Northern and eastern areas are more rural in character, with agricultural activity such as dairy and meat farming. The largest towns in North Lanarkshire are Cumbernauld, which in 2022 had a population of approximately 58,000, followed by Coatbridge (43,970), Airdrie (37,130) and Motherwell (32,120). Other localities include Bellshill, Bargeddie, Moodiesburn, Shotts, Viewpark and Wishaw.

Governance

Political control
The first election to North Lanarkshire Council was held in 1995, initially operating as a shadow authority alongside the outgoing authorities until the new system came into force on 1 April 1996. Political control of the council since 1996 has been as follows:

Leadership
The leaders of the council since 1996 have been:

Political composition

As of 11 August 2022, the council composition is:

Premises

The council is based at Motherwell Civic Centre on Windmillhill Street in Motherwell. The building was built between 1965 and 1970 for the former Motherwell and Wishaw Town Council, and was subsequently used as the headquarters of Motherwell District Council between 1975 and 1996.

Elections
Since 2007 elections have been held every five years under the single transferable vote system, introduced by the Local Governance (Scotland) Act 2004. Election results since 1995 have been as follows:

Wards

The council is made up of 21 wards, as follows:

References

External links

 
Council areas of Scotland
Lanarkshire